Hugh Tarpey (1821 – 3 January 1898) was a leading member of the Irish Liberal Party and a supporter of the campaign for Irish home rule. He served as Lord Mayor of Dublin in 1877 and 1878, High Sheriff of Dublin and as a Justice of the Peace in County Clare.

Tarpey was born in Clarecastle, County Clare, in 1821. He was elected as an alderman in Dublin Corporation for the Royal Exchange ward in 1861, serving until the 1886 local elections. He was an unsuccessful when he ran for the Liberals in Galway Borough.

Hugh Tarpey ran a hotel known as Tarpey's Hotel at 7, 8 and 9 Nassau Street. His townhouse, 51 Upper Mount Street, in now the headquarters of Fine Gael.

He served as Secretary of the Liberal Club.

He died in Tarpey's Hotel in January 1898 and was buried in the O'Connell Circle in Glasnevin Cemetery.

His son, William Bernard Tarpey, also known as William Kingsley Tarpey, was a minor playwright in the late 19th century and early twentieth century.

Arms

References

1821 births
1898 deaths
High Sheriffs of County Dublin
Lord Mayors of Dublin
Burials at Glasnevin Cemetery